The Royal Museum of Fine Arts Antwerp (Dutch: Koninklijk Museum voor Schone Kunsten Antwerpen, KMSKA) is a  museum in Antwerp, Belgium, founded in 1810, that houses a collection of paintings, sculptures and drawings from the fourteenth to the twentieth centuries. This collection is representative of the artistic production and the taste of art enthusiasts in Antwerp, Belgium and the Northern and Southern Netherlands since the 15th century.

The neoclassical building housing the collection is one of the primary landmarks of the Zuid district of Antwerp.  The majestic building was designed by Jean-Jacques Winders (1849–1936) and Frans Van Dijk (1853–1939), built beginning in 1884, opened in 1890, and completed in 1894.  Sculpture on the building includes two bronze figures of Pheme with horse-drawn chariots by sculptor Thomas Vincotte, and seven rondel medallions of artists that include Boetius à Bolswert, Frans Floris, Jan van Eyck, Peter Paul Rubens, Quentin Matsys, Erasmus Quellinus II, and Appelmans, separated by four monumental sculptures representing Architecture, Painting, Sculpture, and Graphics.

The building stands in gardens bounded by the Leopold de Waalplaats, the Schildersstraat, the Plaatsnijdersstraat, and the Beeldhouwersstraat, formerly the site of the Antwerp Citadel.

History 
The museum's collection began with the artworks owned by the Antwerp Guild of Saint Luke, which was active from the late 14th century to 1773. When the guild disbanded, its gallery of paintings went to the Academy of Fine Arts, which had been founded in 1663 with the involvement of David Teniers. The gallery had works by Peter Paul Rubens, Jacob Jordaens, and Cornelis de Vos. During French occupations in 1794 and 1796, art was looted from churches and other buildings in Antwerp; the pieces that were later recovered became part of the museum's collection. By 1817 the museum listed 127 items in its catalogue, mostly dating to the mid-16th and 17th centuries, with Rubens at the heart of the collection.

William I of the Netherlands helped the museum in various ways. In 1823 he donated three paintings, including an early work by Titian—Pope
Alexander IV presents Jacopo Pesaro to Saint Peter—which became the museum's first foreign piece. He decreed a grant of 20,000 guilders to build the collection's contemporary art in 1827, but the Belgian Revolution interfered. Only in 1873 did the museum begin to acquire living artists' works.

A significant bequest from a former mayor of Antwerp, Florent van Ertborn, added 141 works to the collection in 1840. Van Ertborn had collected Early Netherlandish art at a time when it was out of favour, but in the long run this addition ensured the museum's reputation. These works included Jan van Eyck's Saint Barbara and Madonna at the Fountain and Rogier van der Weyden's Portrait of Philip de Croy (half of a diptych) and the Seven Sacraments Altarpiece. Also in the bequest were paintings by Hans Memling, Dieric Bouts, Joachim Patinir, Quinten Massys, Jean Fouquet, Simone Martini, Antonello da Messina, and Lucas Cranach.

The museum closed to the public for major renovations at the end of 2011, reopening on 24 September 2022 after 11 years of work. The museum has been expanded with a new hall for modern art.

Collections 

Artists exhibited in the museum include:
15th century
 Jan van Eyck
 Jean Fouquet
 Rogier van der Weyden
 Hans Memling
16th century:
 Frans Floris de Vriendt
 Quinten Metsijs
 Joachim Patinir
 Marten de Vos
 Gillis Coignet
17th century:
Erasmus de Bie
 Jan Brueghel the Elder
 Anthony van Dyck
 Frans Hals
 Jacob Jordaens
 Theodoor Rombouts
 Peter Paul Rubens
19th century:
 James Ensor
 Auguste Rodin
 Henry van de Velde
 Fernand Khnopff
 Alexandre Cabanel, Cleopatra Testing Poisons on Condemned Prisoners
20th century:
 Pierre Alechinsky
 René Magritte
 Jacob Smits
 Gustave Van de Woestijne
 Rik Wouters

Collection highlights

See also
 Pride and Joy: Children's Portraits in The Netherlands 1500-1700 art exhibition held by the Royal Museum of Fine Arts Antwerp in 2001

References

External links
  
Virtual tour of the Royal Museum of Fine Arts provided by Google Arts & Culture

Museums in Antwerp
Art museums and galleries in Belgium
Art museums established in 1810
Cultural infrastructure completed in 1894
 
1810 establishments in France
Organisations based in Belgium with royal patronage
1810 establishments in the Southern Netherlands